Artem Mikhailovich Bulyansky (born March 16, 1985) is a Russian former professional ice hockey forward who most notably played for HC Yugra of the Kontinental Hockey League (KHL).

References

External links

1985 births
Living people
Salavat Yulaev Ufa players
Rubin Tyumen players
Russian ice hockey right wingers
Toros Neftekamsk players
HC Yugra players
Sportspeople from Ufa